Claudius Scott Cottage is a historic home located near Eastover, Richland County, South Carolina. It was built about 1840, and is a one-story, frame Greek Revival residence. The front façade features a small pedimented porch with four wooden pillars. It was originally built as a summer residence.

It was added to the National Register of Historic Places in 1986.

References

Houses on the National Register of Historic Places in South Carolina
Greek Revival houses in South Carolina
Houses completed in 1840
Houses in Richland County, South Carolina
National Register of Historic Places in Richland County, South Carolina